A BLT is a sandwich with bacon, lettuce and tomato.

BLT may also refer to:

Art, entertainment, and media
B.L.T. (album),  by Jack Bruce, Bill Lordan and Robin Trower
 Beautiful Lady & Television, a monthly magazine in Japan
Brian Lester "BLT" Thomas, a character in the Degrassi High television series

Businesses
Baselland Transport, a Swiss bus and tram operator
BHP, an Australian mining multinational (LSE stock symbol: BLT)
Blackwater Airport, a BHP-owned aerodrome in Queensland (IATA code: BLT)

Science, technology and mathematics
Basic Linguistic Theory, a linguistic typology framework
Bit blit, a computer graphics method
BLT theorem, in mathematical analysis

Other uses
Battalion landing team of the U.S. Marines
Bear-Lion-Tiger, a trio of animals that formed a juvenile bond at Noah's Ark Animal Sanctuary